Wuttichai Yurachai is a Thai boxer. He participated at the 2021 AIBA World Boxing Championships, being awarded the silver medal in the minimumweight event.

References

External links 

Living people
Place of birth missing (living people)
Year of birth missing (living people)
Wuttichai Yurachai
Mini-flyweight boxers
AIBA World Boxing Championships medalists
Boxers at the 2018 Asian Games